Jack Palmer (20 October 1903 – 11 December 1979) was an Australian cricketer. He played in one first-class match for South Australia in 1932/33.

See also
 List of South Australian representative cricketers

References

External links
 

1903 births
1979 deaths
Australian cricketers
South Australia cricketers
Cricketers from Adelaide